Neil Wynn Williams (14 February 1864 – 1 February 1940) was a British novelist, writer and contributor of short stories and articles to the periodicals and journals of his time.

Life
Neil Wynn Williams was born in Hampstead on 14 February 1864, the son of William Rudyard Wynn Williams and Elizabeth Blackwell Campbell Williams (née Lambert). He was educated at Bedford Modern School between 1887 and 1891.

Wynn-Williams's initial published works were two volumes of Greek folklore, Tales And Sketches of Modern Greece that was published in 1894 and The Bayonet That Came Home: A Vanity Of Modern Greece that was published in 1896. In 1904 he was asked to contribute to a writer's view of Paris and wrote about the catacombs of the city.

Wynn-William's science fiction novel, The Electric Theft, was first published in 1906. Although critically judged as having ‘little literary merit’, the novel is suggestive of Ian Fleming’s later James Bond novels: the hero, Reginald Burton, discovers that an anarchist, Boleroff, is in command of a vast electrolytic lake under London that he harnesses for his own means, cutting off London's electricity supply. All the while Burton is having an affair with a daughter of a wealthy British capitalist. At the end of the novel, Boleroff accidentally kills himself.

Wynn-Williams died in Bedford on 1 February 1940. He and his brother, Douglas Wynn Williams, had been accomplished oarsmen in their schooldays and endowed a rowing prize for the fastest pair at their old school. Wynn-Williams was survived by his wife, whom he had married in London on 4 September 1903, and three children.

Selected bibliography
 Tales And Sketches of Modern Greece.  Published by The Bedford Publishing Co., London, David Nutt, 1894
 The Bayonet That Came Home: A Vanity Of Modern Greece.  Published by Edward Arnold, London and New York City, 1896
 Greek Peasant Stories; Or, Gleams And Glooms Of Grecian Colour.  Published by Digby, Long & Co., London, 1899
 An Extraordinary Story. Published by George Newnes, Ltd, London, 1899
 Lady Haife. A Novel, Etc..  Published London, 1901
 The Electric Theft.  Published by Small, Maynard & Company, Boston, 1906

References

External links
 Neil Wynn Williams at WorldCat Identities
 The Electric Theft at The Open Library
 Audiobook, The Catacombs of Paris, by Neil Wynn Williams

1864 births
1940 deaths
British science fiction writers
People educated at Bedford Modern School